Daysi Ivette Torres Bosques is a Nicaraguan politician. She was mayor of Managua, the first female mayor of the city. She occupied the post from 2009 when the former mayor Alexis Argüello died until 2018. She is a member of the Sandinista National Liberation Front.

References

Mayors of Managua
21st-century Nicaraguan women politicians
21st-century Nicaraguan politicians
Living people
Year of birth missing (living people)
Sandinista National Liberation Front politicians